Kasongo is a town and territory in the Democratic Republic of the Congo. Kasongo may also refer to
Kasongo Airport in the city of Kasongo 
Roman Catholic Diocese of Kasongo located in the city of Kasongo 
Kasongo Lunda Territory in the Democratic Republic of Congo 
Kasongo Lunda, a town and seat of Kasongo Lunda Territory 
Kasongo Lunda Airport in Kasongo Lunda
Kasongo (name)